John William McLaren may refer to:

 John McLaren (cricketer) (1886–1921), Australian cricketer
 Mick McLaren (footballer) (1936–2014), Australian rules footballer